Downtown Nappanee Historic District is a national historic district located at Nappanee, Elkhart County, Indiana. The district encompasses 26 contributing buildings in the central business district of Nappanee.  It was developed between about 1874 and 1939, and includes notable examples of Italianate and Classical Revival style architecture.  Notable buildings include the Bechtel Building (1888), U.S. Post Office, Dietrich Block, Kaufman's Department Store (1902), First National Bank, Yoder's Garage, B&O Depot, Hartman Brothers Building (1881, 1914), and Farmers and Traders Bank (1915).

It was added to the National Register of Historic Places in 1990.

References

Historic districts on the National Register of Historic Places in Indiana
Italianate architecture in Indiana
Neoclassical architecture in Indiana
Historic districts in Elkhart County, Indiana
National Register of Historic Places in Elkhart County, Indiana